Agat or AGAT may refer to:
Agat, Burma, a village in Ayeyarwady Region, Burma
Agat, Eritrea, a railway station in Eritrea
Agat, Guam, a village in Guam
Agat (computer), Soviet 8-bit computer
Agat (given name), Russian masculine first name
JW Agat, a unit of the Polish Special Forces
AGAT, an abbreviation for arginine:glycine amidinotransferase, an enzyme
AGAT, an abbreviation for O-6-methylguanine-DNA methyltransferase, a protein